
Gmina Krośniewice is an urban-rural gmina (administrative district) in Kutno County, Łódź Voivodeship, in central Poland.

Villages
Apart from the town of Krośniewice, Gmina Krośniewice contains the villages and settlements of Bardzinek, Bielice, Cudniki, Cygany, Franki, Głaznów, Głogowa, Godzięby, Górki Miłońskie, Iwiczna, Jankowice, Kajew, Kopy, Kopyta, Krzewie, Luboradz, Marynin, Miłonice, Miłosna, Morawce, Nowe, Nowe Jankowice, Ostałów, Pawlikowice, Pniewko, Pomarzany, Raszynek, Rozpacz, Skłóty, Stara Wieś, Stare Morawce, Suchodoły, Szubina, Szubsk Duży, Szubsk-Towarzystwo, Teresin, Tumidaj, Witów, Wola Nowska, Wychny, Wymysłów, Zalesie, Zieleniew and Zosin.

Neighbouring gminas
Gmina Krośniewice is bordered by the gminas of Chodów, Dąbrowice, Daszyna, Kutno and Nowe Ostrowy.

References
Polish official population figures 2006

Krosniewice
Kutno County